Rolf Dohmen (born 4 April 1952 in Kreuzau) is a German football coach and former player who last worked as a general manager (non-coaching role) for Karlsruher SC.

References

1952 births
Living people
German footballers
German football managers
SC Fortuna Köln players
Karlsruher SC players
SV Darmstadt 98 players
Eintracht Frankfurt managers
Bundesliga players
2. Bundesliga players
Association football defenders